Grigol is a Georgian masculine given name. It is a cognate of the name Gregory.

People with the name Grigol include:

Grigol Abashidze (1914–1994), Georgian poet
Grigol Bagration of Mukhrani (1787–1861), Georgian nobleman
Grigol Bakurianis-dze (Gregory Pakourianos, died 1086), Byzantine politician and military commander
Grigol Bediashvili (born 1980), Georgian footballer (goalkeeper)
Grigol Chanturia (born 1973), Georgian footballer
Grigol Dadiani (1770–1804), prince of Mingrelia
Grigol Dadiani (Kolkhideli) (1814–1901), Georgian prince and poet
Grigol Dolidze (born 1982), Georgian footballer
Grigol Giorgadze (1879–1937), Georgian historian, jurist and politician
Grigol Gruzinsky (1789–1830), Georgian prince
Grigol Hamam (died 897), ruler of Hereti (Arran)
Grigol Imedadze (born 1980), Georgian footballer
Grigol of Kakheti (died in 827), prince of Kakheti in eastern Georgia from 786 to 827
Grigol Khandzteli (Gregory of Khandzta, 759–861), Georgian church leader
Grigol Kipshidze (born 2005), Georgian singer
Grigol Kobakhidze (George Coby, 1883–1967) American businessman, first Georgian millionaire
Grigol Labadze (Gia Labadze, born 1973), Georgian rugby player
Grigol Lordkipanidze (1881–1937), Georgian politician and author
Grigol Maisuradze (1817–1885), Georgian painter
Grigol Mamrikishvili (born 1981), Georgian judoka
Grigol Mgaloblishvili (born 1973), Georgian politician and diplomat, Prime Minister of Georgia from 2008 to 2009
Grigol Orbeliani (1804–1883), Georgian Romanticist poet and soldier in the Imperial Russian service
Grigol (Sergo) Orjonikidze (1886–1937), Georgian Bolshevik and Soviet politician
Grigol Peradze (1899–1942), famous Georgian ecclesiastic figure, theologian, historian, Archimandrite, Professor
Grigol Robakidze (1882–1962), Georgian writer, publicist, and public figure
Grigol Tsereteli (1870–1938), distinguished Georgian scientist, one of the founders of Papyrology
Grigol Uratadze (1880–1959), Georgian Social Democratic politician, diplomat and author
Grigol Vashadze (born 1958), Georgian politician, diplomat and Minister for Foreign Affairs of Georgia

References 

Masculine given names
Georgian masculine given names